Diana Chemtai Kipyokei (born 5 May 1994) is a Kenyan long-distance runner. She won the women's race at the 2020 Istanbul Marathon (2:22:06).

2021 Boston Marathon and drug ban
Kipyokei finished first in the women's race at the 2021 Boston Marathon (2:24:45) on 11 October 2021.

In October 2022, the Athletics Integrity Unit announced that she tested positive for triamcinolone acetonide in a test taken after her win. She was provisionally suspended for this positive test, as well as tampering with a part of the doping control. The Boston Athletic Association announced that pending appeal, she would be stripped of her title and the rankings and prize money would be adjusted. On 20 December, it was announced that Diana Kipyokei had been banned for six years and stripped of her Boston Marathon title, with her results disqualified since and including 11 October 2021.

Spelling of name
Less than three days before the 2021 Boston Marathon, Diana told race authorities that she prefers the spelling Kipyokei to Kipyogei. However, her request was made after her race bib had already been printed with Kipyogei.

Personal bests
 10 kilometres – 30:23 (Prague 2018)
 Half marathon – 1:07:07 (Valencia 2018)
 Marathon – 2:22:06 (Istanbul 2020)

Reference

External links
Diana Chemtai KIPYOGEI | Profile | World Athletics

1994 births
Living people
Kenyan female marathon runners
Boston Marathon female winners
21st-century Kenyan women
20th-century Kenyan women
Kenyan sportspeople in doping cases